Rolf Peter Ingvar Stormare (born Storm, August 27, 1953), better known as Peter Stormare, is a Swedish-American actor. He played Gaear Grimsrud in the film Fargo (1996) and John Abruzzi in the television series Prison Break (2005–2007). He has appeared in films including The Lost World: Jurassic Park (1997), Playing God (1997), The Big Lebowski (1998), Armageddon (1998), 8mm (1999), Dancer in the Dark (2000),  Windtalkers (2002), Minority Report (2002), Bad Boys II (2003), Constantine (2005), and 22 Jump Street (2014), and the video games Destiny (2014), Until Dawn (2015), and Destiny 2 (2017).

Early life 

Rolf Peter Ingvar Storm was born in Kumla on August 27, 1953. Soon after, his family moved to Arbrå. He changed his surname when he discovered he shared it with a senior student at an acting academy. Like "storm" (which has the same meaning in Swedish and English), stormare is a Swedish word meaning "stormer". Before settling on Stormare, he briefly contemplated changing his name to Retep Mrots, which is "Peter Storm" backwards.

Acting career 
Stormare voiced Mattias Nilsson in the video games Mercenaries: Playground of Destruction and Mercenaries 2: World in Flames, Isair in the computer game Icewind Dale 2, and Johann Strauss in Quake 4. In February 2006, he starred as Wolfgang in Volkswagen's VDub series of television commercials. He played the main character in the film Svartvattnet, which was filmed in Sweden and Norway in 2007. He was offered a role in the ABC television series Lost for a period of one year, which he declined. In the 2007 film Premonition, he played Dr. Roth. In April 2007, he appeared in the CSI: Crime Scene Investigation episode "Ending Happy".

In 2011, he appeared alongside Kevin Spacey and Daniel Wu in the Chinese film Inseparable, which premiered at the 2011 Busan International Film Festival.

In 2014, he appeared in episodes of Longmire, Arrow, and The Blacklist, and starred in the Eli Roth-produced film Clown.

In 2015, he voiced and motion-captured Dr. Alan J. Hill in the video game Until Dawn. In 2016, he played Rutger Burlin in the Swedish television series Midnattssol; he also co-created, and starred as Ingmar in, the web television series Swedish Dicks, which was renewed for a second season in October 2016. In 2017, he played a minor role in John Wick: Chapter 2 and the part of Czernobog on the Starz series American Gods. He played the vampire Godbrand in the Netflix animated series Castlevania. In 2019 he appeared in the music video of the song "Graven" by the U.S. death metal band Possessed.

Music career 
After Bono of U2 heard some of Stormare's music, he encouraged Stormare to make an album. In 2002, Stormare released his first album, Dallerpölsa och småfåglar. He plays in a band called Blonde from Fargo and runs a record label called StormVox.

He appeared in the music video of the song "Uprising" by the Swedish power metal band Sabaton.

He appeared in the clips "Steh Auf" and "Frau & Mann" of metal project Lindemann.

Personal life 
Stormare divides his time between the United States and Sweden. He married actress Karen Sillas in 1989, and they divorced in 2006. He married Toshimi, a native of Japan, in 2008. Their daughter Kaiya Bella Luna Stormare was born on May 9, 2009. They live in Los Angeles.

Peter Stormare is the godfather of actor Gustaf Skarsgård.

Stormare is a Christian and has said that he has had contact with God. When he was young, he participated in Baptist meetings in Arbrå. He has a strong spiritual side, inherited from his mother, who he has said was a medium, and who supposedly inherited that ability from her own father.

Filmography

Film

Television

Video games

Music videos

Discography

References

External links 

 
 BlondeFromFargo.com
 Interview with Peter Stormare at Eurochannel

1953 births
Living people
Swedish Baptists
Swedish Christians
Swedish expatriates in the United States
Swedish male film actors
Swedish male stage actors
Swedish male television actors
Swedish male video game actors
Swedish male voice actors
People from Kumla Municipality